Carlton is a village in the Metropolitan Borough of Barnsley in South Yorkshire, England. It is situated between the villages of Athersley and Royston.
The village is split in two with one half in the Monk Bretton ward and the rest in the Royston ward of the Barnsley MBC.
It was built up on coking and coal mining industries and now has one of the largest industrial estates within the surrounding area. In the industrial estate lies a glass recycling plant, called Rexam. To its east stands the Mr Kipling cake factory, owned by Premier Foods.

Carlton has two Church of England churches and a Methodist chapel, which is now private housing. A Kingdom Hall of Jehovah's Witnesses serves both the Carlton and Athersley congregations.

An ancient sacred spring or holy well existed near to the modern-day Carlton Road and became associated with St Helen in early Christian times. The name St Helen's was used for a 20th-century secondary school near to the site of the old well which merged with the original Edward Sheerien School in 1992 (the new Edward Sheerian School merged with Royston High in 2009 to form Carlton Community College). The school is now known as Outwood Academy Carlton, after gaining academy status in 2016 following a report from OFSTED placing the school in special measures.

Carlton has its own village group www.carltonvillage.co.uk that is accessible to all villagers.
Carlton has also a junior football team called the Bridge Tigers which has teams ranging from u-7s to u-15s playing at Carlton park.

See also
Listed buildings in Royston, South Yorkshire

References

External links

Villages in South Yorkshire
Geography of Barnsley